Gennadi Georgiyevich Lushchikov  was born in Tokur, Amur, Russia. He is a Soviet sport shooter and won a bronze medal in the 50 metre rifle prone event at the 1976 Summer Olympics in Montreal.

References

1948 births
2004 deaths
Olympic shooters of the Soviet Union
Shooters at the 1976 Summer Olympics
Olympic bronze medalists for the Soviet Union
Olympic medalists in shooting
Medalists at the 1976 Summer Olympics
Sportspeople from Amur Oblast